The National Democratic Party  (Narodna Demokratska Strakna, NDS) was a political party in Bosnia and Herzegovina.

History
The party was established in 2003. It contested the 2006 general elections in an alliance with the Pensioners' Party, but failed to win a seat in either the national or Republika Srpska elections.

In 2010 the NDS contested both national and Republika Srpska elections. In the elections to the national House of Representatives, the party received 1.1% of the vote in Republika Srprska, failing to win a seat. In Republika Srprska elections the party received 2.1% of the vote, winning two seats.

In 2013 the party merged with the Democratic Party to form the National Democratic Movement.

References

Defunct political parties in Bosnia and Herzegovina
Political parties in Republika Srpska
Political parties established in 2003
2003 establishments in Bosnia and Herzegovina
Political parties disestablished in 2013
2013 disestablishments in Bosnia and Herzegovina